Aleksei Leonidovich Fomkin (30 August 1969 – 24 February 1996) was a Soviet Russian actor best known for his recurring appearances in the children's television series Yeralash and for his lead role in Guest from the Future.

Filmography

Guest from the Future (1985) 
Povod (1986)
Na Svoei Zemle (1987)

Later life
After returning from service in the army, Fomkin was briefly a part of the Moscow Art Theatre. He left Moscow for Vladimir, Russia, where he worked as a miller and met his wife, Elena.

On 24 February 1996, Fomkin was staying over at an apartment with some friends. When the apartment building caught on fire, he was asleep and thus, was the only one who did not make it out safely, eventually suffocating in the smoke.

He is buried in Vladimir.

References

External links
Aleksei Fomkin. IMDb

1969 births
1996 deaths
20th-century Russian male actors